Perezia may refer to:
 Perezia (plant), a genus of flowering plants in the family Asteraceae
 Perezia (microsporidian), a fungus genus in the division Microsporidia